The 1987–89 FIRA Trophy was the 27th edition of a European rugby union championship for national teams. It was played along two seasons (1987–1988 and 1988–89).

The tournament was won by France, with a single loss to Soviet Union (17–10) in Kutaisi. Despite facing strong opposition from both Italy and Soviet Union, the French only awarded caps in their games with Romania, who finished in 3rd place, while the Soviets reached the 2nd place. Spain lost all their matches and were relegated.

The winners of the Second division two pools were Poland and Belgium, who faced each other in a final, with the Poles winning (25–23).

First division 

 Spain relegated to second division

Second division

Pool A

Pool B

Final 

 Poland promoted to Division 1

Third division 

 Bulgaria promoted to division 2

Bibliography 
 Francesco Volpe, Valerio Vecchiarelli (2000), 2000 Italia in Meta, Storia della nazionale italiana di rugby dagli albori al Sei Nazioni, GS Editore (2000) .
 Francesco Volpe, Paolo Pacitti (Author), Rugby 2000, GTE Gruppo Editorale (1999).

References

External links
1987-89 FIRA Trophy at ESPN

1987-89
1987–88 in European rugby union
1988–89 in European rugby union
1989 rugby union tournaments for national teams
1988 rugby union tournaments for national teams
1987 rugby union tournaments for national teams